Valery Gordeev (born 28 August 1952 in Balakovo, Soviet Union) is a former Soviet international speedway rider who reached the finals of the Speedway World Championship five times. His older brother Vladimir Gordeev is also a former rider who qualified for the World Final on three occasions and was sensationally disqualified in 1971 for using illegal fuel additives.

World Final appearances

Individual World Championship
 1972 -  London, Wembley Stadium - 16th - 2pts
 1973 -  Chorzów, Silesian Stadium - 8th - 7pts
 1975 -  London, Wembley Stadium - 13th - 4pts
 1976 -  Chorzów, Silesian Stadium - 15th - 1pt

World Team Cup
 1973 -  London, Wembley Stadium (with Vladimir Paznikov / Grigory Khlinovsky / Viktor Trofimov / Aleksandr Pavlov) - 3rd - 20pts (7)
 1974 - , Stadion Śląski, Chorzów (with Vladimir Paznikov / Mikhail Krasnov / Viktor Kalmykov / Anatoly Kuzmin) - 4th - 10pts (4)
 1975 –  Norden, Motodrom Halbemond (with Vladimir Gordeev / Grigory Khlinovsky / Viktor Trofimov) – 2nd – 29pts (8)
 1976 -  London, White City Stadium (with Viktor Trofimov / Grigory Khlinovsky / Vladimir Gordeev / Vladimir Paznikov) - 4th - 11pts (5)
 1981 -  Olching, Speedway Stadion Olching (with Mikhail Starostin / Viktor Kuznetsov / Nikolay Kornev / Anatoly Maksimov) - 4th - 3pts (0)

References

1952 births
Living people
Russian speedway riders
Soviet speedway riders
People from Balakovo
Sportspeople from Saratov Oblast